The 2022 Marshall Thundering Herd men's soccer team represented Marshall University in men's college soccer during the 2022 NCAA Division I men's soccer season. It was be the 44th season the university fielded a men's varsity soccer program.  The Thundering Herd, led by sixth-year head coach Chris Grassie, played their home games at Veterans Memorial Soccer Complex as members of the Sun Belt Conference (SBC).  

The Thundering Herd played in the inaugural eight team College Spring League during the 2022 spring season, ultimately winning the championship match held in Columbus, Ohio at Historic Crew Stadium vs. Bowling Green, 2-1.

Roster 
Updated September 23, 2022

Schedule 
Source:

Spring Season

Exhibitions

Regular season

Conference Tournament

NCAA Tournament

Awards and honors

Rankings

2023 MLS Draft

References

External links 

      

2022
2022 Sun Belt Conference men's soccer season
American men's college soccer teams 2022 season
Marshall Thundering Herd men's soccer
Marshall